The second season of The Bachelorette Australia premiered on Network Ten on 21 September 2016. The season features Georgia Love, a 27-year-old journalist from Melbourne, Victoria, originally from Tasmania, courting 18 men.

Contestants 
The season began with 16 contestants. In episode 5, two "intruders" were brought into the competition, bringing the total number of contestants to 18.

Future appearances

Bachelor Winter Games
Courtney will represent The Bachelor Australia in The Bachelor Winter Games; a Winter Olympics themed spin-off is the American Bachelor Franchise.

Call-Out Order

Color Key

Episodes

Episode 1
Original airdate: 21 September 2016

Episode 2
Original airdate: 22 September 2016

Episode 3
Original airdate: 28 September 2016

Episode 4
Original airdate: 29 September 2016

Episode 5
Original airdate: 5 October 2016

Episode 6
Original airdate: 6 October 2016

Episode 7
Original airdate: 12 October 2016

Episode 8
Original airdate: 13 October 2016

Episode 9
Original airdate: 19 October 2016

Episode 10
Original airdate: 20 October 2016

Episode 11
Original airdate: 26 October 2016

Episode 12
Original airdate: 27 October 2016

Ratings

Notes

References

2016 Australian television seasons
Australian (season 02)
Television shows filmed in Australia
Television shows filmed in Singapore